Swardspeak (also known as gay speak or "gay lingo") is an argot or cant slang derived from Taglish (Tagalog-English code-switching) and used by a number of LGBT people in the Philippines.

Description
Swardspeak uses elements from Tagalog, English, Spanish, and some from Japanese, as well as celebrities' names and trademark brands, giving them new meanings in different contexts. It is largely localized within gay communities, making use of words derived from the local languages, including Cebuano, Hiligaynon, Kapampangan, Pangasinan, Waray and Bicolano.

Usage
A defining trait of swardspeak slang is that it more often than not immediately identifies the speaker as homosexual, making it easy for people of that orientation to recognize each other. This creates an exclusive group among its speakers and helps them resist cultural assimilation. More recently, even non-members of the gay community have been known to use this way of speaking, e.g. heterosexual members of industries dominated by gays, such as the fashion and film industries.

Swardspeak as a language is constantly changing, with old phrases becoming obsolete and new phrases frequently entering everyday usage, reflecting changes in their culture and also maintaining exclusivity. The dynamic nature of the language refuses to cement itself in a single culture and allows for more freedom of expression among its speakers. Words and phrases can be created to react to popular trends and create alternatives to a strictly defined lifestyle. By these characteristics, swardspeak creates a dissident group without any ties to geographical, linguistic, or cultural restrictions, allowing its speakers to shape the language as they see fit, with relation to current times. In this way, the language is not only "mobile" and part of a larger community, but also open to more specific or local meanings and interpretations.

Origin
The word "swardspeak", according to José Javier Reyes, was coined by columnist and film critic Nestor Torre in the 1970s. Reyes himself wrote a book on the subject entitled Swardspeak: A Preliminary Study. "Sward" is an outdated slang for 'gay male' in the Philippines. The origin of the individual words and phrases, however, has existed longer and come from a variety of sources.

Conventions
Swardspeak is a form of slang (and therefore highly dynamic, as opposed to colloquialisms) that is built upon preexisting languages. It deliberately transforms or creates words that resemble words from other languages, particularly English, Japanese, Chinese, Spanish, Portuguese, French, and German. It is colorful, witty, and humorous, with vocabularies derived from popular culture and regional variations. It is unintelligible to people not familiar with the Filipino gay culture or who do not know the rules of usage. There is no standardized set of rules, but some of the more common conventions are shown below:

Replacing the first letter/syllable of words with the letter "J"/"Sh" or the syllables "Jo-"/"Sho-" or "Ju-"/"Shu-".

Replacing the first letter/syllable of words with "Ky-" or "Ny-".

 Replacing the end syllable of words with "-ash", "-is", "-iz", "-ish", "-itch", "-ech", "-ush", or "-oosh" as a diminutive or augmentative suffix.

Replacing "a", "o", or "u" sounds with "or", "er", or "ur", especially directly before or after the consonant "l".

 Inverting the letter order of a word, similar to Tagalog syllable switching slang. It is predominantly used in Cebuano swardspeak.

 Word play, puns, malapropisms, code-switching, onomatopoeic words that resemble preexisting words, and deliberately incorrect Anglicization of words.

 References to popular culture, usually celebrities or TV shows. They can be selected to replace a word in reference to the things they were famous for, simply because parts of the words rhyme, or both.

Borrowed words from other languages, particularly long disused Spanish words in the Philippines (which has feminine forms of words preferred in swardspeak that is absent in most Filipino languages), English, and Japanese.

Examples

Translation of the traditional Filipino nursery rhyme Ako ay May Lobo (I have a balloon) into swardspeak.

Translation of the traditional Filipino nursery rhyme Bahay Kubò (Nipa hut) into swardspeak.

See also

 Tagalog profanity
 Bahasa Binan, a similar dialect in Indonesia
 Gayle language, an Afrikaans-based gay argot
 IsiNgqumo, a South African gay argot based on the Bantu languages
 Lavender linguistics
 LGBT culture in the Philippines
 LGBT slang
 Manila sound, a musical genre from the Philippines often characterized by the use of swardspeak
 Polari, cant slang used in Britain

References

Bibliography
DV Hart, H Hart. Visayan Swardspeak: The language of a gay community in the Philippines - Crossroads, 1990
Manalansan, Martin F. IV. “’Performing’ the Filipino Gay Experiences in America: Linguistic Strategies in a Transnational Context.” Beyond the Lavender Lexicon: Authenticity, Imagination and Appropriation in Lesbian and Gay Language. Ed. William L Leap. New York: Gordon and Breach, 1997. 249–266
Manalansan, Martin F. IV. “Global Divas: Filipino Gay Men in the Diaspora”, Duke University Press Books, November 19, 2003.

External links
Gay Language

Cant languages
English-based argots
LGBT linguistics
LGBT in the Philippines
Macaronic forms of English
Filipino slang